Chávez Ravine may refer to:

 Chavez Ravine, the area in Los Angeles, California, where Dodger Stadium is located
 A nickname for Dodger Stadium itself
 The Battle of Chavez Ravine, controversy surrounding the 1951–1961 government acquisition of land in Chavez Ravine largely owned by Mexican Americans
 Chavez Ravine, a 1992 film by Norberto Barba
 Chávez Ravine: A Los Angeles Story:, a 2003 documentary by Jordan Mechner
 Chávez Ravine (album), a 2005 concept album by musician Ry Cooder